Cerace myriopa is a species of moth of the family Tortricidae. It is found in Sichuan, China.

The wingspan is about 56 mm. The forewings are blackish purple, suffused with black along the costa and with white markings. The hindwings are whitish, the apical half suffused with pale yellow and brighter posteriorly. There are irregular greyish-brown transverse blotches, which become black towards the apex.

References

Moths described in 1922
Ceracini